The 2014 FIFA World Cup was an international football tournament that was held in Brazil from 12 June to 13 July 2014. The 32 national teams involved in the tournament were required to register a squad of 23 players, including three goalkeepers. Only players in these squads were eligible to take part in the tournament.

A provisional list of 30 players per national team was submitted to FIFA by 13 May 2014. FIFA published the 30-player provisional lists on their website on 16 May 2014. The final lists of 23 players per national team were submitted to FIFA by 2 June 2014. FIFA published the 23-player final lists, with the squad numbers, on their website, on 5 June 2014. Teams were permitted to make late replacements in the event of serious injury, at any time up to 24 hours before their first game.

The age listed for each player is on 12 June 2014, the first day of the tournament. The number of caps listed for each player does not include any matches played after the start of the 2014 FIFA World Cup. The club listed is the club for which the player last played a competitive match prior to the tournament. The nationality for each club reflects the national association (not the league) to which the club is affiliated.

The Netherlands was the only team to use all of its 23 players during the tournament, making it the fourth team in World Cup history to ever use all of its players in the squad, after France in 1978, and both Greece and Russia in 1994 (although in all these cases 22 players were used since the 23-player squads were not introduced until 2002 FIFA World Cup).

Group A

Brazil
Coach: Luiz Felipe Scolari

The final squad was announced on 7 May 2014. The squad numbers were revealed on 2 June.

Cameroon
Coach:  Volker Finke

The final squad was announced on 2 June 2014.

Croatia
Coach: Niko Kovač

The final squad was announced on 31 May 2014. With less than 48 hours until the opening game against Brazil, Milan Badelj was called up to replace the injured Ivan Močinić, after having previously been excluded from the final squad.

Mexico
Coach: Miguel Herrera

The final squad was announced on 9 May 2014. However, midfielders Luis Montes and Juan Carlos Medina sustained injuries afterwards and were replaced by Javier Aquino and Miguel Ángel Ponce.

Group B

Australia
Coach: Ange Postecoglou

The final squad was announced on 3 June 2014.

Chile
Coach:  Jorge Sampaoli

The final squad was announced on 1 June 2014.

Netherlands
Coach: Louis van Gaal

The final squad was announced on 31 May 2014. The squad numbers were revealed on 2 June, during a press conference with Van Gaal.

Spain
Coach: Vicente del Bosque

The final squad was announced on 31 May 2014. The squad numbers were revealed on 3 June.

Group C

Colombia
Coach:  José Pékerman

The final squad was announced on 2 June 2014. However, midfielder Aldo Leão Ramírez sustained injury afterwards and was replaced by Carlos Carbonero.

Greece
Coach:  Fernando Santos

The final squad was announced on 19 May 2014.

Ivory Coast
Coach:  Sabri Lamouchi

The final squad was announced on 1 June 2014.

Japan
Coach:  Alberto Zaccheroni

The final squad was announced on 12 May 2014. The squad numbers were revealed on 25 May.

Group D

Costa Rica
Coach:  Jorge Luis Pinto

The final squad was announced on 31 May 2014.

England
Coach: Roy Hodgson

England's final squad was announced on 12 May 2014, including seven standby squad members: John Ruddy, Jon Flanagan, John Stones, Michael Carrick, Tom Cleverley, Andy Carroll and Jermain Defoe. Of those seven, only Stones and Flanagan joined the rest of the squad at a training camp in Portugal, with Stones serving as a like-for-like replacement option for Phil Jones, who was still recovering from a shoulder injury. Both Stones and Flanagan travelled with the squad to their pre-tournament training base in Miami, and remained with the team in Brazil in the event of any injuries prior to the opening game. The squad numbers were revealed on 22 May.

Italy
Coach: Cesare Prandelli

The final squad was announced on 1 June 2014. The squad numbers were revealed the next day.

Uruguay
Coach: Óscar Tabárez

The final squad was announced on 31 May 2014.

Group E

Ecuador
Coach:  Reinaldo Rueda

The final squad was announced on 2 June 2014. The squad numbers were revealed the next day. However, midfielder Segundo Castillo was replaced by Oswaldo Minda after injuring ligaments in his right knee.

France
Coach: Didier Deschamps

The final squad was announced on 13 May 2014. Though originally selected, Franck Ribéry was removed due to a back injury.

Honduras
Coach:  Luis Fernando Suárez

The final squad was announced on 5 May 2014.

Switzerland
Coach:  Ottmar Hitzfeld

The final squad was announced on 13 May 2014.

Group F

Argentina
Coach: Alejandro Sabella

The final squad was announced on 2 June 2014.

Bosnia and Herzegovina
Coach: Safet Sušić

The final squad was announced on 2 June 2014.

Iran
Coach:  Carlos Queiroz

The final squad was announced on 1 June 2014.

Nigeria
Coach: Stephen Keshi

The final squad was announced on 2 June 2014. Ejike Uzoenyi replaced Elderson Echiéjilé due to injury on 7 June.

Group G

Germany
Coach: Joachim Löw

The final squad was announced on 2 June 2014. On 7 June, Marco Reus was replaced by Shkodran Mustafi after Reus injured his ankle.

Ghana
Coach: James Kwesi Appiah

The final squad was announced on 1 June 2014. On 26 June 2014, midfielders Sulley Muntari and Kevin-Prince Boateng were sent home and indefinitely suspended from the national team for disciplinary reasons.

Portugal
Coach: Paulo Bento

The final squad was announced on 19 May 2014. The squad numbers were revealed on 24 May.

United States
Coach:  Jürgen Klinsmann

The final squad was announced on 22 May 2014.

Group H

Algeria
Coach:  Vahid Halilhodžić

The final squad was announced on 2 June 2014.

Belgium
Coach: Marc Wilmots

The final squad was announced on 2 June 2014. However, a medical test on 3 June showed goalkeeper Koen Casteels had not completely recovered from his tibia injury and he was replaced by Sammy Bossut.

Russia
Coach:  Fabio Capello

The final squad was announced on 2 June 2014. However, midfielder Roman Shirokov was later removed from the squad due to a long-standing Achilles tendon injury and replaced by Pavel Mogilevets.

Note: a 2012 friendly match against Lithuania, recognized by the Russian Football Union but not by FIFA, is not counted.

South Korea
Coach: Hong Myung-bo

The final squad was announced on 8 May 2014.

Statistics

Player representation by age

Players
Oldest:  Faryd Mondragón
Youngest:  Fabrice Olinga

Goalkeepers
Oldest:  Faryd Mondragón
Youngest:  Stefanos Kapino

Captains
Oldest:  Mario Yepes
Youngest:  Koo Ja-cheol

Player representation by league system
League systems with twenty or more players represented are listed. England includes two Premier League clubs based in Wales, Swansea City and Cardiff City (five World Cup squad members played for these clubs); the United States includes three MLS clubs based in Canada, Toronto FC, Vancouver Whitecaps FC and Montreal Impact (three World Cup squad members played for these clubs); and France includes one Ligue 1 club based in Monaco, AS Monaco (four World Cup squad members played for this club). In all, World Cup squad members played for clubs in 54 countries, and played in 51 different national leagues.

The Russian squad was made up entirely of players from the country's domestic league. England's squad had only one player employed by a non-domestic club: Fraser Forster was employed in Scotland; although it was also part of the United Kingdom, they had a separate national federation and league system from England. The Belgian squad had the most players from a single foreign federation, with twelve players employed in England, although one of these, Thibaut Courtois, was only on loan to English club Chelsea prior to the tournament. Of the countries not represented by a national team at the World Cup, Turkey's league provided the most squad members.

Only Uruguay's squad was made up entirely of players employed by overseas clubs, although one player on that squad, Sebastián Coates, played for a domestic club immediately before the World Cup, doing so while on loan from English club Liverpool. Three squads had only one domestic-based player (Ivory Coast, Bosnia and Herzegovina and Ghana).

Player representation by club
Clubs with ten or more players represented are listed.

Coaches representation by country
Coaches in bold represented their own country.

See also
 2010 FIFA World Cup squads

References

External links
 
Official Players List
 Preliminary Squads List 

Squads
FIFA World Cup squads